The Ministry of Social Security (abbreviated MPS) is a cabinet-level federal ministry in Brazil. On 2 October 2015, it was fused with the Ministry of Labor and Employment, becoming the Ministry of Labor, Employment and Social Security. It was later recreated by president Luiz Inácio Lula da Silva in 2023. The incumbent minister is Carlos Lupi.

See also
 Other ministries of Social Security

References

External links
 Official site 

Social Security